Baavare Prem He is an Indian Marathi language film directed and writer by Ajay Kishor Naik and produced by Nilesh Singh, Nimesh Desai and Virendra Chavan. The film stars Urmilla Kothare , Siddharth Chandekar and Vidyadhar Joshi. The film was released on 26 September 2014.

Synopsis 
Neil and Ananya are poles apart but, in spite of their differences, he falls in love with her while in Goa. He pursues her, hoping to get out of the friend zone.

Cast 
 Urmilla Kothare as Ananya Shirodkar
 Siddharth Chandekar as Neil Rajadhyaksha
 Vidyadhar Joshi as Gonsalves
 Supriya Vinod as Asmita Shirodkar 
 Shantanu Gangane as Mohit Patil
 Ashwini Ekbote as Aarti Rajadhyaksha
 Madhav Abhyankar as Jayant Rajadhyaksha
 Tejashri Dharane as Sonali

Soundtrack

Critical response 
Baavare Prem He received mixed reviews from critics. Mihir Bhanage of The Times of India rated the film 2.5 out of 5 stars and wrote "Overall, the film, though predictable, hits the right chords and is sure to be a treat for love-story aficionados". Ganesh Matkari of Pune Mirror wrote "The film features some nice enough songs, competent performances, Goan locations, and makes for a decent two hours of viewing". A reviewer from Divya Marathi wrote "Along with weaving a beautiful love story, the director has succeeded in making the audience elated".

Accolades

References

External links
 
 

2014 films
2010s Marathi-language films
Indian drama films